Thomas Baillie (10 March 1868 – 20 November 1934) was a South African cricketer. He played in one first-class match for Border in 1897/98.

See also
 List of Border representative cricketers

References

External links
 

1868 births
1934 deaths
South African cricketers
Border cricketers
Cricketers from Sunderland